William Andelfinger (December 15, 1880 – December 23, 1968) was an American gymnast. He competed in three events at the 1904 Summer Olympics.

References

1880 births
1968 deaths
American male artistic gymnasts
Olympic gymnasts of the United States
Gymnasts at the 1904 Summer Olympics
Sportspeople from St. Louis